The I. and E. Greenwald Steam Engine No. 1058 is a historic stationary steam engine or mill engine in Miami, Florida. It is located at 3898 Shipping Avenue. It was notable for its use of a rope-drive pulley to lineshafts.   It was added to the U.S. National Register of Historic Places in 1987, and removed in 2018.

References

History of Miami
National Register of Historic Places in Miami
Buildings and structures completed in 1906
1906 establishments in Florida
Former National Register of Historic Places in Florida